Fritz Walther Meissner (German: Meißner) (16 December 1882 – 16 November 1974) was a German technical physicist.

Meissner was born in Berlin to Waldemar Meissner and Johanna Greger.  He studied mechanical engineering and physics at the Technical University of Berlin, his doctoral supervisor being Max Planck. He then entered the Physikalisch-Technische Bundesanstalt in Berlin. From 1922 to 1925, he established the world's third largest helium-liquifier, and discovered in 1933 the Meissner effect, damping of the magnetic field in superconductors. One year later, he was called as chair in technical physics at the Technical University of Munich.

After World War II, he became the president of the Bavarian Academy of Sciences and Humanities. In 1946, he was appointed director of the academy's first low temperature research commission. Laboratories were located in Herrsching am Ammersee until 1965, when they were moved to Garching. Meissner lived alone with his two dogs for the last several years of his life. Meissner died in Munich in 1974.

References

External links 

 

Engineers from Berlin
Commanders Crosses of the Order of Merit of the Federal Republic of Germany
Academic staff of the Technical University of Munich
1882 births
1974 deaths
Members of the Bavarian Academy of Sciences
20th-century German physicists